The 2003 Comhairle nan Eilean Siar election (Western Isles council) to the Comhairle nan Eilean Siar was held on 1 May 2003 as part of the wider 2003 Scottish local elections.

Aggregate results

Ward results

References

2003 Scottish local elections
2003